USS Sabalo has been the name of more than one United States Navy ship, and may refer to:

, a patrol vessel in commission from 1917 to 1919
, a submarine in commission from 1945 to 1946 and from 1951 to 1971

United States Navy ship names